The Chinese dollar may refer to various historical currencies:

 Dai Fook dollar (taifupiao) of the Qing Empire
 Yuan Shikai dollar (dayangyin) of the Chinese Empire
 Fengtian dollar (fengpiao) of Warlord China
 Harbin dollar (dayangpiao) of Warlord China
 Old Taiwan dollar
 New Taiwan dollar

See also
 Spanish silver dollar, used widely as currency in imperial China
 Chinese Yuán or RMB, sometimes informally referred to as "Chinese dollars"
 Hong Kong dollar
 History of Chinese currency

Currencies of China